Dollar is a 1938 Swedish comedy film directed by Gustaf Molander and starring Ingrid Bergman,  Georg Rydeberg and Tutta Rolf.

The film's art direction was by Arne Åkermark.

Plot summary
Ludvig and Sussi Battwyhl, Louis and Katja Brenner and Julia and Kurt Balzar are upper class millionaires. They don't seem to do any real work but still need a vacation in the mountains. Everybody seems to be romantically involved with everybody. A rich American woman joins them.

Cast
 Ingrid Bergman as Julia Balzar  
 Georg Rydeberg as Kurt Balzar  
 Tutta Rolf as Sussi Brenner  
 Kotti Chaveas Louis Brenner  
 Birgit Tengroth as Katja von Battwyhl 
 Håkan Westergren as Ludvig von Battwyhl  
 Edvin Adolphson as Dr. Jonson  
 Elsa Burnett as Mary Jonston 
 Margareta Bergfeldt as Woman in the Hotel Lobby  
 Olle Björklund as Young Man at the Hotel  
 Millan Bolander as Karin - Nurse  
 Gösta Cederlund as Man at The Royal Yacht Club  
 Erland Colliander as Man at The Royal Yacht Club  
 Nils Dahlgren as Man at The Royal Yacht Club  
 Ernesto Dethorey as Walker - Argentine Poker Player  
 N. Dickson as Charles - Mary's Black Chauffeur  
 Aina Elkan as Hotel Clerk  
 Ingrid Envall as Hotel Maid  
 David Erikson as Hall Porter  
 George Fant as Young Man in the Hotel lobby  
 Wilhelm Haqvinius as Man at The Royal Yacht Club  
 Hester Harvey as Mammy - Mary Jonston's Maid  
 Axel Högel as Andersson - Royal Yacht Club Valet  
 Helge Kihlberg as Jansson - Waiter at The Royal Yacht Club 
 Allan Lindner as Calle - the Bellboy  
 Yngve Nyqvist as Man at The Royal Yacht Club  
 Erik Rosén as Man at The Royal Yacht Club  
 Carl Ström as Man at The Royal Yacht Club  
 Silvia Zelazowsky as Woman in the Hotel Lobby

References

Bibliography 
 Mariah Larsson & Anders Marklund. Swedish Film: An Introduction and Reader. Nordic Academic Press, 2010.

External links 
 
 
 

1938 films
1938 comedy films
Swedish comedy films
1930s Swedish-language films
Films directed by Gustaf Molander
Swedish black-and-white films
1930s Swedish films